Cerro Paranal is a mountain in the Atacama Desert of northern Chile and is the home of the Paranal Observatory. It is the site of the Very Large Telescope and the VLT Survey Telescope.

Gallery

References

External links 

 Cerro Paranal

Paranal
Paranal